Liberty Fire Company No. 5 is a historic fire station located at Reading, Berks County, Pennsylvania. It was built in 1876, and is a three-story, brick building in the Italianate style. It was originally two-stories, with the third story added in 1895. The third story and roofline is reflective of the Victorian Romanesque style. The building is now operated as the Reading Area Firefighters Museum.

It was listed on the National Register of Historic Places in 1985.

References

External links
Official website

Fire stations completed in 1876
Fire stations completed in 1895
Italianate architecture in Pennsylvania
Romanesque Revival architecture in Pennsylvania
Buildings and structures in Berks County, Pennsylvania
Defunct fire stations in Pennsylvania
Fire stations on the National Register of Historic Places in Pennsylvania
Museums in Reading, Pennsylvania
Firefighting museums in the United States
National Register of Historic Places in Reading, Pennsylvania
1876 establishments in Pennsylvania